Mirosław Andrzej Waligóra (born 4 February 1970 in Kraków) is a former Polish footballer.

Career

National team
He represented his native country at the 1992 Summer Olympics in Barcelona. There he won the silver medal with the national squad.

References

External links
 Profile on Polish Olympic Committee
  Profile at 90minut.pl

1970 births
Living people
Polish footballers
Ekstraklasa players
Hutnik Nowa Huta players
Olympic footballers of Poland
Footballers at the 1992 Summer Olympics
Olympic silver medalists for Poland
Footballers from Kraków
Polish expatriate footballers
Expatriate footballers in Belgium
Olympic medalists in football
K.F.C. Lommel S.K. players
Medalists at the 1992 Summer Olympics
Association football forwards